Andrea Toniatti (born 13 August 1992 in Rovereto) is an Italian cyclist, who last rode for UCI Continental team .

Major results

2009
 2nd Overall Tre Ciclistica Bresciana
1st Stage 2
2010
 9th Overall Giro della Lunigiana
 10th Overall Tre Ciclistica Bresciana
2012
 8th Circuito del Porto
2013
 1st Ruota d'Oro
 1st Stage 3 Giro della Valle d'Aosta
 2nd Time trial, National Under-23 Road Championships
2014
 2nd Gran Premio di Poggiana
 6th Piccolo Giro di Lombardia
 6th Giro del Medio Brenta
 9th Gran Premio della Liberazione
2015
 4th Giro del Medio Brenta
 10th 
2017
 1st GP Laguna Porec
 1st Trofeo Alcide Degasperi
 7th Trofeo Città di Brescia
2018
 3rd GP Laguna
 5th Trofeo Alcide Degasperi
2019
 3rd Trofeo Città di Brescia

References

External links

1992 births
Living people
Italian male cyclists
People from Rovereto
Competitors at the 2018 Mediterranean Games
Mediterranean Games competitors for Italy
Sportspeople from Trentino
Cyclists from Trentino-Alto Adige/Südtirol